The  Censorship and Entertainments Control Act 1967 is an Act of Parliament in Zimbabwe. It was passed by the Parliament of Rhodesia in 1967 to target obscenity and blasphemy in literature and film. The act was most frequently evoked by the Rhodesian government to censor sexual content in literary works or communist literature. Rhodesian era bans on literature for politically subversive content were reversed in 1980 after the country achieved internationally recognised independence as Zimbabwe. However, the new Zimbabwean government continued to evoke the act to ban literature and films for obscenity, a broad label which it has extended to include explicit sexual content and positive portrayals of homosexuality.

The Act repealed elements of the Entertainments Control and Censorship Act, 1932, the Subversive Activities Act, 1950, and the Emergency Powers (Control of Publications) Act, 1965.

See also
Censorship in Zimbabwe

References

External links
Text of the Act

Zimbabwean legislation
Censorship in Zimbabwe
Politics of Rhodesia
1967 in Rhodesia
1967 in law